Twenterand is a municipality in the province of Overijssel in the eastern Netherlands. The name means "edge of Twente" as it is situated on the northwestern fringe of the historical region of Twente.

The municipality of Twenterand also had two city halls, because of the merger between the former municipalities of Vriezenveen and Den Ham in 2001. The city hall in Vriezenveen remained. The extended municipality of Vriezenveen is called Twenterand since 2003.  The former municipal area of Vriezenveen belongs to the region of Twente and the former municipal area of Den Ham partly to the region of Salland and partly to the region of Twente.

Population centres 

Dutch topographic map of the municipality of Twenterand, June 2015

Transportation
Geerdijk railway station
Vriezenveen railway station
Vroomshoop railway station

Notable people 

 Louis Reijtenbagh (born 1946 in Den Ham) a Dutch businessman, investor, a retired general practitioner and art collector
 Sabine Uitslag (born 1973 in Westerhaar-Vriezenveensewijk) a former Dutch politician
 Manon Fokke (born 1976 in Vriezenveen) a Dutch politician
 Sanne Nijhof (born 1987 in Den Ham) a Dutch model

Sport 
 Berend Veneberg (born 1963 in Den Ham) a former strongman and powerlifter
 Jarno Hams (born 1974 in Hengelo) a strongman
 Johan Kenkhuis (born 1980 in Vriezenveen) swimmer, won bronze at the 2000 Summer Olympics  
 Christian Kist (born 1986 in Mariënberg) a Dutch professional darts player
 Maayke Heuver (born 1990 in Vriezenveen) a former Dutch footballer, 154 caps for FC Twente and 17 for NL women's team

Gallery

References

External links

Official website

 
Salland
Twente
Municipalities of Overijssel
Municipalities of the Netherlands established in 2003